NHF is a three-letter acronym that may refer to the following organisations:

National Hairdressers' Federation
National Health Federation
National Heritage Foundation
National Housing Federation
Nazia Hassan Foundation
Norwegian Association of the Disabled